Local elections in Navotas were held on May 13, 2019, within the Philippine general election. The voters elected for the mayor, vice mayor, one congressman, and the councilors – six in each of the city's two districts.

Background
Incumbent Mayor John Rey Tiangco, who has fulfilled the limit of three terms for the position, ran for the city's congressional seat, switching positions with his brother, former mayor Toby. Incumbent vice-mayor Clint Geronimo is also running for re-election.

They fought against the candidates of Damayan ng Responsableng Mamamayan (DRM Team), a coalition of Partido Federal ng Pilipinas (PFP) and Aksyon Demokratiko (Aksyon). They are incumbent 2nd district councilor Dan Israel "DI" Ang (PFP, for mayor), former vice-mayor Lutgardo "Gardy" Cruz's son Raymond "RC" Cruz (Aksyon, for vice mayor) and incumbent 2nd district councilor Marielle del Rosario-Tumangan (Aksyon, for congressman).

The Tiangcos' political party Partido Navoteño (Navoteño) signed an agreement with Hugpong ng Pagbabago (HNP), the party of Pres. Rodrigo Duterte's daughter Sara Duterte-Carpio for the election.

Vote buying allegations
On May 12, 2019, NBI agents raided the briefing of poll watchers for Damayan ng Responsableng Mamamayan and Akbayan Party-List at a gymnasium in Barangay Daanghari (2nd District) due to allegations of vote buying. Emilio Marañon III, lawyer of congressional candidate Marielle del Rosario-Tumangan, denied the allegations and called the NBI operation "illegal".

Candidates
Incumbents are represented in italics.

Representative, Lone District
Incumbent Representative Toby Tiangco is term-limited and is running for Mayor. His brother, incumbent Mayor John Reynald Tiangco, is his party's nominee.

Mayor
Incumbent Mayor John Rey Tiangco is term-limited and is running for congressman. His brother, incumbent Representative Toby Tiangco, is his party's nominee.

Vice-Mayor
Incumbent Vice-Mayor Clint Geronimo is running for re-election against Raymond "RC" Cruz.

Councilors

By ticket

Team JTC

Damayan ng Responsableng Mamamayan

Independent

By district

1st District

 

|-
| colspan="5" style="background:black;"|

2nd District

 

|-
| colspan="5" style="background:black;"|

References

2019 Philippine local elections
Elections in Navotas
May 2019 events in the Philippines
2019 elections in Metro Manila